If Rock & Roll Were a Machine is a young adult novel written by Terry Davis.  It was first published in 1992 and was re-released in a new edition in March 2003.  Despite its title, it has little to do with machines and less to do with rock and roll: it primarily focuses on the central character's coming of age through the sport of racquetball.

Plot summary
Albert "Bert" Bowen, a high school junior, is still suffering from the lack of self-esteem he developed following criticism from his fifth-grade teacher. However, a developing interest in writing and racquetball and a new motorcycle, as well as support from understanding adults, help him discover who he really is.

The novel is set in the same high school as Vision Quest, but twenty years later.

Awards
 New York Public Library Best Books for the Teen Age, 1994
 ALA Best Books for Young Adults, 1993
 New York Public Library Best Books for the Teen Age, 1993

External links
If Rock & Roll Were a Machine at Fantastic Fiction

1992 American novels
American young adult novels